David Gwilym Jones (10 June 1914 – 30 May 1988) was a Welsh footballer. His regular position was as a defender. He was born in Ynysddu. He played for Cardiff City, Newport County, Manchester United, Wigan Athletic, and Swindon Town.

References

1914 births
People from Ynysddu
Sportspeople from Caerphilly County Borough
1988 deaths
Welsh footballers
Cardiff City F.C. players
Newport County A.F.C. players
Wigan Athletic F.C. players
Manchester United F.C. players
Swindon Town F.C. players
English Football League players
Association football defenders